is a Japanese video game designer and video game music composer. He began his career working for Konami and Square in the 1990s, then joined fellow ex-Square designers at Love-de-Lic in 1996, where he designed UFO: A Day in the Life. Kudo now works as director for the developing company Vanpool.

Works

References

External links
Composer profile at OverClocked ReMix
Developer Profile at MobyGames

Japanese composers
Japanese male composers
Japanese male musicians
Japanese video game designers
Konami people
Living people
Musicians from Osaka
Square Enix people
Video game composers
Year of birth missing (living people)